African time (or Africa time) is the perceived cultural tendency, in parts of Africa and the Caribbean toward a more relaxed attitude to time.  This is sometimes used in a pejorative sense, about tardiness in appointments, meetings and events. This also includes the more leisurely, relaxed, and less rigorously scheduled lifestyle found in African countries, especially as opposed to the more clock-bound pace of daily life in Western countries. As such, it is similar to time orientations in some other non-Western culture regions.

Aspects
The appearance of a simple lack of punctuality or a lax attitude about time in Africa, may instead reflect a different approach and method in managing tasks, events, and interactions. African cultures are often described as "polychronic", which means people tend to manage more than one thing at a time rather than in a strict sequence. Personal interactions and relationships are also managed in this way, such that it is not uncommon to have more than one simultaneous conversation. An African "emotional time consciousness" has been suggested which contrasts with Western "mechanical time consciousness".

In the Caribbean, "...[t]hings just won't always happen as quickly or as precisely as you may be accustomed to". Due to the cultural influence of "Caribbean time" or "island time", locals do not have the sense of time pressure that is part of Western culture.

Reactions to time orientation in Africa and the Caribbean

Self-criticism and commentary
The concept of African time has become a key topic of self-criticism in modern Africa. According to one Ghanaian writer,

In October 2007, an Ivorian campaign against African time, backed by President Laurent Gbagbo, received international media attention when an event called "Punctuality Night" was held in Abidjan to recognize business people and government workers for regularly being on time. The slogan of the campaign is "'African time' is killing Africa – let's fight it." Reuters reported that "organizers hope to heighten awareness of how missed appointments, meetings or even late buses cut productivity in a region where languid tardiness is the norm". It was remarked that this year's winner, legal adviser Narcisse Aka—who received a $60,000 villa in recognition of his punctuality—"is so unusually good at being punctual that his colleagues call him 'Mr White Man's Time'". Some Western tourists in the Caribbean "...become infuriated if locals don't respond as promptly or as efficiently to every request as employees or service personnel do back home".

Popular culture

The contrast between African time and Western time is illustrated in the award-winning short film Binta and the Great Idea. The protagonist of the film, a fisherman in a small village in Senegal, can't understand the new ideas brought back from Europe by his friend; these are symbolized by a Swiss wristwatch, which rings at various times to the delight of the friend, but for no apparent reason. The fisherman is shown making his way through the various ranks of officials with his idea, which in the end is a sharp criticism of Western culture's obsession with efficiency and progress.

See also

 Time in Africa
 Colored people's time
 Slow Movement
 Procrastination & Punctuality
 Tardiness § Ethnic stereotypes
 Time management

References

African culture
Time in Africa